The 2012 Spanish Grand Prix (formally the Formula 1 Gran Premio de España Santander 2012) was a Formula One motor race held on 13 May 2012, at the Circuit de Catalunya in Montmeló, Spain, attended by 82,000 people. It was the fifth round of the 2012 Formula One World Championship and the 22nd Spanish Grand Prix at the track. Williams's Pastor Maldonado won the 66-lap event from pole position. He was followed by Fernando Alonso in second driving for Ferrari with Lotus' Kimi Räikkönen third.

Sebastian Vettel entered the race as the World Drivers' Championship leader while his team Red Bull were top of the World Constructors' Championship. Lewis Hamilton qualified his McLaren fastest in qualifying; he was excluded from qualifying for breaking the technical regulations on fuel, forcing him to begin the race from the back of the grid. Maldonado thus inherited pole position and was overtaken by Alonso at the start of the Grand Prix. After the first two cycles of pit stops for a new set of tyres, Maldonado undercut Alonso, who remained out for two more laps and was delayed by a slower driver during the second pit stop cycle. On lap 41, Maldonado's third pit stop was slow due to a tyre fitting fault and retook first by passing Räikkönen on lap 47. Alonso overtook Räikkönen on the following lap and drew close to Maldonado; he could not pass Maldonado who maintained the lead for the rest of the race and achieved his maiden and only Formula One win. Alonso finished 3.1 seconds behind in second and Räikkönen took third after being put on an alternate strategy intended to give him victory.

Maldonado was the fifth driver to win a Grand Prix in the season's first five races. As of 2023, he is the only Venezuelan driver to have won a Formula One race. 

After the race, Vettel and Alonso jointly led the World Drivers' Championship with 61 points each. Hamilton finished eighth, falling from second to third, as Räikkönen's third-place result promoted him from seventh to fourth. Red Bull with 109 points maintained the World Constructors' Championship lead over McLaren and Lotus in second and third respectively with 15 races remaining in the season.

Background

Tyre supplier Pirelli brought the yellow banded soft and the silver-banded hard dry compound tyres to the race. McLaren team principal Martin Whitmarsh and Mercedes' Michael Schumacher criticised Pirelli for the extreme sensitivity of their tyres, and brought a different set of tyres to better demonstrate a difference in performance and tyre durability. The single drag reduction system (DRS) activation zone was placed on the straight linking the final and first corners.

Before the race, Red Bull driver Sebastian Vettel led the World Drivers' Championship with 53 points, ahead of McLaren's Lewis Hamilton and Vettel's teammate Mark Webber in second and third. Hamilton's teammate Jenson Button and Ferrari driver Fernando Alonso tied for fourth position with 43 points. Red Bull led the World Constructors' Championship with 101 points; McLaren and Lotus were second and third with a respective 92 and 57 points. Ferrari stood in fourth with 45 points and Mercedes were fifth with 37 points.

Starting on 1 May and ending two days later, the teams conducted a three-day test at the Mugello Circuit in Italy ahead of the Spanish Grand Prix. The test gave teams the opportunity to assess major aerodynamic and mechanical upgrades and the behaviour of tyres. The HRT team elected not to take part in the test, choosing to concentrate on establishing themselves at their new headquarters at the Caja Mágica in Madrid instead. Alonso was fastest on the first day of testing on a drying circuit. Lotus driver Romain Grosjean and Sauber's Kamui Kobayashi set identical lap times to go quickest on the second day of testing. Vettel was quickest on the morning of the final day and Grosjean led the afternoon session.

The championship had so far been tumultuous with four different drivers winning the first four rounds of the season. Red Bull team principal Christian Horner said he felt consistency across races which teams could not win would determine the championship winner:

Alonso had won the  before finishing no higher than seventh in the next two races and falling ten points behind Vettel in the Drivers' Championship. He said updates to his car would potentially improve his performance in Spain and was uncertain as to whether if it would help him: "Having said that, it's not the case that if we are not on pole in Barcelona then it's the end of the world." After finishing second at the preceding , Räikkönen said his objective was to win the race in Spain: "That is the target for me and the team. We want to win grands prix. We have a good car and we saw in Bahrain it is good enough to win. That's the target." Hamilton believed passing would be difficult in Spain and hoped to achieve a good qualifying performance for an easier race, saying: "It's always been a tough place for passing – as I found out last year – but I really hope DRS and KERS-Hybrid combined will make it a little easier."

A total of 12 teams (each representing a different constructor) each entered two race drivers, with no changes from the season entry list. There were four driver changes for the first practice session. Dani Clos, a test driver for the HRT team, was allowed by team principal Luis Pérez-Sala to drive Narain Karthikeyan's HRT F112 car for the first time in an official Formula One session. Alexander Rossi of the Formula Renault 3.5 Series made his debut in a practice session for the Caterham team in Heikki Kovalainen's CT01 vehicle. Williams reserve driver and 2011 GP3 Series champion Valtteri Bottas drove Bruno Senna's car, and Force India reserve driver Jules Bianchi drove in lieu of Paul di Resta.

Practice
Per the regulations for the 2012 season, three practice sessions were held, two 90-minute sessions on Friday morning and afternoon and another 60-minute session on Saturday morning. In the first practice session, which took place in clear and warm weather, Alonso lapped fastest with a time of 1 minute, 24.430 seconds with 21 minutes to go. Vettel, who was quickest for 15 minutes, Kobayashi, Button, Bottas, Mercedes driver Michael Schumacher, Grosjean, Hamilton, Räikkönen and Force India's Nico Hülkenberg occupied positions two to ten. The HRT car of Pedro de la Rosa bottomed out braking for the first corner and removing the right-rear bargeboard. The bodywork was later retrieved from turn one. Clos stopped with a car mechanical problem at the top of the conclusion of the entry to the pit lane.

Conditions warmed in the second session on Friday afternoon. Button, driving with a chronic understeer, set the day's fastest lap of 1 minute, 23.399 seconds on the soft compound tyres with 55 minutes remaining. Vettel duplicated his first practice result in second, Mercedes' Nico Rosberg was third and Hamilton improved to fourth. The Lotus duo of Räikkönen and Grosjean were fifth and sixth and Webber, Schumacher, Kobayashi and Hülkenberg followed in the top ten. Teams conducted simulations on how their cars would behave in the race. Some drivers ran off the track during the session. Webber carried excess speed and drove onto the turn four gravel trap. The floor of Webber's RB8 car accumulated gravel and stones deposited on the racing line after rejoining the circuit via an area of grass between the gravel and a tyre wall. Sergio Pérez went off the track at the same corner in his Sauber car.

The third session took place in warm and dry weather on Saturday morning. Several drivers led before Vettel set the session's fastest time, a 1-minute, 23.168 seconds on the soft compound tyres. Williams driver Pastor Maldonado set the second-quickest lap and Kobayashi improved to third. Webber, Pérez, Alonso, Toro Rosso driver Jean-Éric Vergne, Button, Räikkönen and Rosberg made up positions four to ten. Grosjean's Lotus car lost power due to a sudden loss in fuel pressure that stalled his engine at turn ten 17 minutes into the session. His session ended early because mechanics were unable to rectify the problem. After the session, Schumacher and Hamilton were summoned to the stewards to discuss an incident in which the latter ran wide at turn 13 and rejoined the track in front of the former before slowing at the apex to turn 15. The stewards imposed a reprimand on Schumacher after agreeing it was a minor incident.

Qualifying

Saturday afternoon's qualifying session was split into three parts. The first session ran for 20 minutes, eliminating cars that finished 18th or lower. The second session lasted 15 minutes, eliminating cars that finished 11th to 17th. The final ten-minute session determined pole position to tenth. Cars that qualified for the final session had to start the race on the tyres with which they set their quickest lap times in the session. Conditions were warm and dry for qualifying. The track got faster by around eight-tenths of a second per lap rather than the usual three-tenths of a second. Unlike other fast drivers, Hamilton did two timed laps and beat Alonso and Maldonado to take what would have been his third pole position of 2012, the 22nd of his career and McLaren's 150th in Formula One with a time of 1 minute, 21.707 seconds. Maldonado qualified provisional second despite an untidy lap while Alonso saved a set of soft tyres and set the third-fastest lap. Grosjean used a setup from what Lotus learnt the day before to take fourth. His teammate Räikkönen, fifth, made minor errors during his lap on the soft tyres. Pérez was the faster Sauber driver in sixth, with Rosberg seventh after one lap set early in the third session on a new set of left-hand tyres and used right-hand compounds. Vettel and Schumacher in eighth and ninth both elected not to complete a full lap in the third session as a tyre-saving measure for the race. Kobayashi, tenth, suffered a hydraulic leak en route to the pit lane at the conclusion of the second session, causing his team Sauber to instruct him to stop his car to ensure it sustained no further damage.

Button, 11th, was the fastest driver not to qualify for the final session due to an unbalanced car with understeer in high-speed corners and an unstable rear entering slower speed turns when McLaren added angle to his front wing. Red Bull misjudged how much the track would improve and Webber was told to not exit the pit lane for a second timed lap, leaving him 12th after going second early in the second session. Force India's Di Resta and Hülkenberg were 13th and 14th; the aerodynamic balance on Di Resta's car was altered for his final lap of the second session. Vergne in 15th qualified higher than his teammate Ricciardo in 16th for the first time in the season after Toro Rosso modified their cars overnight. Senna in 18th failed to advance beyond the first session due to spinning his car into the gravel trap at turn 12 in a bid to qualify for the second session at the conclusion of the first. Vitaly Petrov, 19th, located a balance on the soft tyres and kinetic energy recovery system (KERS) mapping made him happier braking in his Caterham but ran wide at turn three. He qualified ahead of his teammate Heikki Kovalainen in 20th for the first time in 2012; Kovalainen lost time through an error at turn three. Charles Pic in 21st beat his Marussia teammate Timo Glock in 22nd by four-tenths of a second, as the latter made an error and had tyre problems. An improved car balance put Pedro de la Rosa of the HRT team in 23rd, while a flat-spotted tyre caused by Karthikeyan spinning at turn three hindered his teammate. Karthikeyan failed to qualify within 107 per cent of Hamilton's fastest time in the first session as a result of a loose rooftop cowling housing a camera.

Post-qualifying

Hamilton was instructed to stop his car en route to the pit lane due to a lack of fuel to provide the Fédération Internationale de l'Automobile (FIA; Formula One's governing body) a sample, since the refuelling mechanic mistakenly turned a switch to drain Hamilton's car of fuel rather than add some in. The FIA technical delegate reported Hamilton to the stewards for the irregularity. McLaren technical director Sam Michael argued to the stewards that force majeure caused Hamilton to stop on the track; they rejected the argument and deemed the team to have broken the technical regulations on refuelling. Hamilton was therefore ordered to start at the back of the grid and every driver behind him gained one position. The stewards allowed Karthikeyan to start the race after deeming him capable of lapping within the 107 per cent limit in the third practice session.

Qualifying classification
The fastest lap in each of the three sessions is denoted in bold.

Notes
  – Lewis Hamilton was excluded from qualifying and demoted to the back of the grid for breaking refuelling regulations by failing to provide the FIA with enough fuel for analysis.
  – Narain Karthikeyan failed to set a lap time within 107 per cent of the fastest lap time in the first session. He was allowed to start the race at the discretion of the stewards.

Race
The race took place in the afternoon from 14:00 local time, and was attended by 82,000 spectators. A lighting thunderstorm fell on the track overnight but the weather became clear and dry before turning overcast prior to the start of the Grand Prix. Every driver began on the soft compound tyres; due to improved wear of the tyres in 2012, it appeared more likely drivers would make three pit stops not four observed in 2011. When the race commenced, Maldonado's clutch slipped more than he expected and he turned right to block Alonso. He pushed Alonso onto the grass but the latter kept accelerating and took the lead from Maldonado on the inside entering the first corner. Pérez overtook Grosjean but the two made contact, puncturing the former's rear-left tyre. He controlled the car on the outside of turn three. At turn four, Rosberg overtook Grosjean for fourth place, and Rosberg's teammate Schumacher began challenging Grosjean for sixth soon after passing Vettel for seventh. Hamilton moved from 24th to 20th by the end of the first lap while Massa made up five positions over the same distance.

At the first lap's conclusion, Alonso led Maldonado by 1.3 seconds with Räikkönen third, Rosberg fourth and Grosjean fifth. Pérez made a pit stop to switch to the hard compound tyres and rejoined the race at the back of the field. Pic lost control of his car exiting turn three but continued without other drivers striking his car. At the front, Maldonado spent the early laps behind Alonso and not attempting to pass him but remaining as far back as possible to avoid being affected by the aerodynamic turbulence of Alonso's Ferrari to avoid tyre damage and to discover where his car was strong and weak compared to the Ferrari. Alonso was not able to pull clear of Maldonado and began reporting left-hand tyre wear on lap six. On the following lap, Webber was the first driver to make a scheduled pit stop for the hard compound tyres in a bid to drive without any aerodynamic turbulence affecting his car in his bid to pass Massa. Webber's teammate Vettel followed with a pit stop on the eighth lap and he rejoined the track in 18th on the hard compound tyres. Webber had earlier almost got caught out and avoided hitting the rear of an early braking Karthikeyan trying to pass the HRT driver. Kobayashi, Rosberg and Button followed in due course over the following two laps.

Hamilton forced Hülkenberg to make a driving error at turn nine and passed him for 11th on lap nine. At lap ten's end, Alonso led Maldonado by 1.1 seconds and made his first pit stop for a new set of hard compound tyres. He emerged in third and Maldonado took the lead. Maldonado made his first pit stop to replace his old soft compound tyres at the 11th lap's end, followed by Räikkönen in second. The two exited the pit lane second and third on hard and used soft compound tyres respectively as Alonso retook first. Räikkönen and his teammate Grosjean drove on used soft tyres; since Lotus thought the lap time difference between the hard and soft tyres would be larger. On lap 12, after Rosberg overtook the yet-to-stop Senna, Grosjean went to the outside of Senna and the two drivers made contact at the first corner, removing part of Grosjean's front wing. Schumacher attempted to draw close to Senna braking for the first corner on the next lap before Schumacher struck the rear of Senna's vehicle following a late attacking move. Schumacher abandoned his car with the front wing folded underneath in the gravel and Senna stopped further around the track and retired.

On the 15th lap, Hamilton had a problematic pit stop from fourth. He struck a detached left-rear tyre leaving his pit box, lifting his car into the air and dropping him to 14th. Grosjean used DRS to pass Rosberg on the outside for sixth into turn one on the next lap; Rosberg delaying Grosjean meant the latter was 20 seconds behind his teammate Räikkönen. Webber lost front load on his front wing, slowing him and dropping him from 9th to 14th behind Di Resta, Vergne, Massa, Hülkenberg and Hamilton during lap 17. He made a pit stop for a front wing replacement on the lap after and fell to 17th. At the front, Maldonado lapped faster than Alonso and closed the gap from 2.3 seconds to 1.5 seconds by the time Williams chief strategist Mark Barnett asked him to make a second pit stop for a new set of hard compound tyres on the 25th lap. Maldonado rejoined in third, eight seconds behind Räikkönen. Barnett calculated Maldonado could drive 42 laps on his current set of tyres and do another pit stop without losing speed. A wheel problem for Karthikeyan meant he pulled over to the side of the track near the pit lane inside exit to retire.

Alonso was delayed by Pic's slower car into turn one and he made his second pit stop at the end of lap 26. Williams' strategy enabled Maldonado to pass Alonso who was six seconds behind the former after exiting the pit lane. Räikkönen made his second pit stop from the lead for the hard compound tyres at the conclusion of lap 27 and rejoined the track in third. On lap 28, Vettel and Massa were imposed drive-through penalties for ignoring yellow flags telling them to slow for turn one for Schumacher's stricken car because they deployed DRS. Massa took his penalty immediately while Vettel served his three laps later. Vettel fell from sixth to ninth, ahead of Hülkenberg and teammate Webber. On lap 32, Maldonado was radioed to manage his rear tyres and maintain his seven-second lead over Alonso in second. Alonso remained seven seconds behind Maldonado so as to not to overstress his tyres. During lap 33, Kobayashi overtook Button on the outside entering turn five for seventh with minor contact between the two drivers. Three laps later, Hamilton made his final pit stop for a new set of hard compound tyres from fifth since he pushed hard, wearing his old set of tyres. He rejoined the circuit in heavy traffic in 14th.

Pic was imposed a drive-through penalty for ignoring blue flags for delaying Alonso earlier in the race, but he entered the garage to retire with driveshaft failure on lap 37. On lap 38, Vettel used DRS to pass Button on the outside for seventh at the first corner. Pérez pulled off to the side of the track in the final third of the lap and became the Grand Prix's final retiree with a transmission fault on lap 40. When Alonso began drawing closer to Maldonado by half a second per lap, Williams chief strategist Mark Barnett asked the latter to stop for a new set of hard compound tyres at lap 41's conclusion. The team had difficulty installing the rear-left wheel, forcing Maldonado to remain stationary for a little longer than expected. Maldonado fell to third, behind Alonso and Räikkönen. Vettel made an pit stop for new tyres and a front wing after sustained damage on the left of the wing on lap 43, falling to 10th. Maldonado drew closer to the yet-to-stop Räikkönen by a second, as Alonso entered the pit lane for his final tyre stop on lap 45, falling to third. Räikkönen led for two laps until Maldonado deployed DRS to claim the lead into the first corner on lap 47. On the lap after, Alonso passed Räikkönen using DRS on the main straight for second.

Räikkönen, third, made his final pit stop for the hard compound tyres in a strategy that would see him attempt to force Maldonado and Alonso to race beyond the life expectancy of their tyres, allowing him to achieve victory at the last minute. He reemerged in fourth on the 49th lap. By lap 49, Alonso drew to within a second of Maldonado and could use DRS through tyre overuse after the latter was told to slow to preserve his compounds and keep the former in second. Grosjean made a pit stop from fourth on the 52nd lap to relinquish third to his teammate Räikkönen. The gap between Maldonado and Alonso varied between 1.3 seconds and 0.6 seconds over the following six laps caused by the presence of slower cars as the two drivers were caught by Räikkönen who appeared unlikely to pass them before the race concluded unless their tyres degraded. On the 59th lap, Vettel braked later than Button and passed him on the inside at turn ten for eighth. The following two laps saw Kobayashi make contact with Rosberg at turn five before overtaking the Mercedes driver on the inside at the tenth corner for fifth. Vettel held off Hamilton for seventh on the outside using DRS into turn one on lap 63.

On the 65th lap, Vettel passed Rosberg, whose lack of rear grip created wheelspin, on the inside exiting turn eight for sixth. At the front, Maldonado opened up a lead of more than three seconds after Alonso fell back with a feeling of a sudden loss of rear grip which slowed him after mounting the kerbs exiting turn seven with nine laps to go. Maldonado was the fifth driver to win a Grand Prix in the season's first five events. Alonso followed 3.195 seconds later in second with Räikkönen third drawing to within 0.689 seconds of Alonso. Grosjean followed in fourth, ahead of Kobayashi in fifth, Vettel sixth, Rosberg seventh, Hamilton eighth, Button ninth and Hülkenberg tenth. Webber was 11th after failing to pass Hülkenberg in the Grand Prix's final stages. Vergne, Ricciardo, Di Resta after running slower on the hard compound tyres, Massa, Kovalainen, Petrov, Glock and de la Rosa were the final classified finishers.

Post-race

The top three drivers appeared on the podium to collect their trophies and spoke to the media in the subsequent press conference. Maldonado talked of "a wonderful day" and the race as vindication of progress his team had made in the preceding season: "It was a tough race because of the strategy as well, it was hard especially because of rear tyres, after a couple of laps we were struggling with them, but I need to say I am pretty happy because car was so competitive since the first lap." Alonso was complimentary towards the spectators and television viewers after his second-place finish and hoped drivers would understand the importance of compliance with the regulations after Pic delayed him, adding: "It's more of a penalty the penalty we paid – maybe the race win – but yeah a little bit disappointed." Räikkönen said he was slightly disappointed to not be competitive enough because he felt the correct strategy would have enabled him to not fall behind too far in the final laps but challenge for the lead, adding: "We need, like, ten more laps and then I think we could have been fighting for the win."

Maldonado's victory was celebrated widely in Venezuela, with photographs of his celebrating featured in the Venezuelan press and television. He was elevated to national hero status with residents of the Venezuelan capital Caracas unfurling banners saying "Maldonado, pride of Venezuela!" and blasting car horns to celebrate his victory. Hugo Chávez, the Venezuelan president and a friend of Maldonado's, telephoned the driver on the evening of celebration, offering his congratulations "in the name of Venezuela." Toto Wolff, a Williams board member, felt Maldonado's performance silenced his critics on his pay driver status and believed his last lap crash at the  helped improve his mindset. Conspiracy theories emerged after the race that the Williams team used performing-enhancing tyres supplied to them by Pirelli on Maldonado's car to provide team owner Frank Williams a Grand Prix win a month after his 70th birthday. Team consultant Alexander Wurz dismissed the theory, saying in a 2020 interview with ORF that he and Williams chief designer Ed Wood were the first to understand how to heat the front tyre over the rim to swiftly resolve the issue of air flow volume cooling the wheels via the rim.

The stewards investigated the collision between Schumacher and Senna on lap 13 after the race. They deemed Schumacher wholly responsible for the collision and imposed upon him a five-place grid penalty to be served at the following . After reviewing television footage, Schumacher was annoyed and said Senna turned right to defend his position before steering left under braking. Senna refuted this, saying he did not expect a collision with Schumacher and turned left because he believed the latter would be on the inside upon observing the Mercedes driver's manoeuvre. Hamilton stated he was pleased with his team bettering the performance of his vehicle and his conserving his tyres and making two pit stops was vindictive of him preserving tyre life: "I was the only one to do a two stopper, despite everyone always telling me how aggressive my driving style is and how much better my team-mate is on tyres than me." Grosjean stated the start was difficult because he found it hard to get the front of his car working as a result of his first lap front wing damage. Rosberg said tyre management was the issue with his Mercedes team and was bemused it slowed him.

As a consequence of the final race positions, Vettel and Alonso were joint leaders in the World Drivers' Championship with 61 points each. Hamilton dropped from second to third with 53 points and Räikkönen's third-place finish promoted him from seventh to fourth with 49 points. Webber's failure to score points demoted him from third to fifth with 48 points. The World Constructors' Championship saw Red Bull maintained their lead with 109 points. McLaren were still second with 98 points and Lotus kept third with 84 points. Ferrari were fourth with 63 points with Mercedes and Williams both holding fifth place with 43 points each with 15 races remaining in the season.

Williams garage fire
About 90 minutes after the race, the Williams garage caught fire. Pit crews from the Williams, Force India and Caterham teams were able to bring the blaze under control. Thirty-one people were injured, with seven transferred to local hospitals. All were later released. Early accounts surfaced suggesting that the fire was caused by fuel that exploded while being prepared for a routine post-race inspection. Photographs taken at the scene showed Senna's car as being the point of origin of the fire, which ignited when a fuel rig used to drain the car started leaking, while other reports suggested that a spark from the KERS unit initiated the blaze. Senna's FW34 car was damaged as a result; Maldonado's car was not in the garage at the time. Teams were reported as lending replacement equipment to Williams for the Monaco Grand Prix, and the team modified its fuel handling safety procedures. Maldonado rescued his twelve-year-old cousin Manuel from the fire, as he had a broken foot.

Race classification
Drivers who scored championship points are denoted in bold.

Championship standings after the race

Drivers' Championship standings

Constructors' Championship standings

 Note: Only the top five positions are included for both sets of standings.

See also
 2012 Catalunya GP2 Series round
 2012 Catalunya GP3 Series round

Footnotes

References

External links

Spanish Grand Prix
Spain
Grand Prix
May 2012 sports events in Europe